= West Mahé =

West Mahé is a region of Seychelles.
